Crebbin is a surname. Notable people with the surname include:

Bill Crebbin (1869–1924), Australian rules footballer
Philip Crebbin (born 1951), British sailor
Tom Crebbin (born 1964), Australian rules footballer